James Graham Fair (December 3, 1831December 28, 1894) was an Irish immigrant to the United States who became a highly successful mining engineer and businessman. His investments in silver mines in Nevada made him a millionaire, and he was one of the famous "silver kings" who became wealthy on the Comstock Lode. Fair later became a real estate investor and railroad builder in California. In 1881, he was elected a United States Senator from Nevada. Nearly all other major so-called robber barons were Protestants (Episcopal or Presbyterian) while Fair himself was a Roman Catholic born into poverty.

Early life
Born to a poor Irish family in Clogher, County Tyrone, James Fair came with his father to the United States in 1843 and grew up on a farm in  Illinois. There he received an extensive education in business before moving to California in 1850, where he prospected the Feather River country for gold embedded in quartz rather than pan for placer gold. His attention shifted to Nevada, where he operated a stamp mill on the Carson River and landed various mine superintendent positions around the Comstock Lode region. He became superintendent of the Hale and Norcross Mine in Virginia City, Nevada in 1867.

He formed a partnership with three fellow Irishmen: John William Mackay and the San Francisco saloon owners James C. Flood and William S. O'Brien. The company was formally Flood and O'Brien, but popularly known as the "Bonanza Firm". The four made large fortunes in shares in silver mines on the Comstock Lode, the first major silver district discovered in the United States. In twenty years time the Comstock Lode produced over one hundred million dollars. The partners controlled and operated various mines on the Comstock, but their greatest success came in 1873 when miners in their Consolidated Virginia mine found the large ore body that became known as "the big bonanza."

Fair invested his portion in railroads and real estate, bringing his private fortune up to $50 million. Although Fair was acknowledged to be a capable mine superintendent and a shrewd businessman, he was not well liked, and carried the nickname "Slippery Jim." He invested much of his income from the Comstock in railroads and San Francisco real estate.  Fair and Mackay owned the Nevada Bank of San Francisco, a rival to William Chapman Ralston's Bank of California; after the collapse of Ralston's financial empire, the Nevada Bank was for a time the largest bank in America at the height of the silver boom.

South Pacific Coast Railroad

In 1876, in partnership with several others, Fair established the narrow-gauge South Pacific Coast Railroad. From its beginning near present-day Newark, the line extended down the east side of San Francisco Bay, through San Jose and Los Gatos and southward over the Santa Cruz Mountains over a route that entailed a 6,200-foot tunnel, another 5,000-foot tunnel and six shorter ones. Some six hundred Chinese workers were employed in clearing, grading, laying track and tunneling. In that last activity, thirty-one workers lost their lives, primarily from explosions of underground natural gas. At its southern end, the railroad acquired the Santa Cruz & Felton Railroad in Felton. The line over the mountains was completed in May 1880.

The South Pacific Coast Railroad was immediately successful and soon profitable. In 1886, Southern Pacific purchased SPC for six million dollars. Southern Pacific later converted it to standard gauge and operated it until 1940, when the over-the-mountains portion of the line was abandoned.

Political career
Fair was elected by the Nevada legislature to the U.S. Senate in 1881. He was not much interested in Washington, where he promoted silver issues in the Senate at a time when a movement was afoot to demonetize silver. Fair served one term after which he moved back to San Francisco in 1887.

Personal life

In 1861, Fair married Theresa Rooney, who had been keeping a boarding house. She divorced him in 1883 on grounds of "habitual adultery" and brought up their four children on her own, with a very considerable settlement.

In 1890, his eldest daughter "Tessie" was married to Hermann Oelrichs of Norddeutsche Lloyd shipping lines in the grandest wedding that San Francisco had seen. Fair remained in his hotel suite without an invitation. He gave Tessie a million dollars as a wedding gift nonetheless.

His will left $40 million in trust to his two daughters, Mrs. Hermann Oelrichs (née Theresa "Tessie" Alice Fair) and Virginia Graham Fair (who later married William Kissam Vanderbilt II), and his surviving son, Charles Lewis Fair, who died in a car accident in France on August 14, 1902, at age 35, having been disinherited by his father.

After Fair's death, Mrs. Nettie Cravens came forward claiming to be his wife. She presented her evidence to a court at trial, but lost the case. She moved to Iowa and lived in obscurity, spending her last days in a mental institution. Later, women's rights advocate Phoebe Couzins also claimed a relationship with Fair.

Death and legacy
Fair died on 1894 in San Francisco, California, and was originally buried in Laurel Hill Cemetery; after the cemetery closed he was re-buried in Holy Cross Cemetery in Colma, California. 

The Fairmont San Francisco hotel was built as a grand monument to Fair by his daughters Theresa Fair Oelrichs and Virginia Fair Vanderbilt, who named it in honor of their father. Construction began in 1902, but they sold their interests in 1906, days before the 1906 San Francisco earthquake.

Fair is remembered in Santa Cruz, California in the naming of Fair Avenue, and in San Francisco with Fair Avenue in Bernal Heights.

See also
List of United States senators born outside the United States

References

Further reading
Tales of Love and Hate in Old San Francisco, Millie Robbins. San Francisco: Chronicle Books, 1971.
Rosecliff, J. Walton Ferguson. Newport: The Preservation Society of Newport County, 1977. Rosecliff was built for Fair's daughter, Mrs. Oelrichs.

External links

Entry from the Biographical Directory of the United States Congress
The Valley Post, 5/10/2005 Fair's South Pacific Coast Railroad

1831 births
1894 deaths
People from County Tyrone
Irish emigrants to the United States (before 1923)
American Roman Catholics
Nevada Democrats
Democratic Party United States senators from Nevada
American prospectors
History of San Francisco
Nob Hill, San Francisco
Businesspeople from San Francisco
Politicians from San Francisco
American mining businesspeople
American railway entrepreneurs
People from Geneva, Illinois
19th-century American politicians
Burials at Holy Cross Cemetery (Colma, California)
19th-century American businesspeople
Burials at Laurel Hill Cemetery (San Francisco)